Vegetia is a genus of moths in the family Saturniidae first described by Karl Jordan in 1922.

Species
Vegetia dewitzi (Maassen & Weymer, 1886)
Vegetia ducalis Jordan, 1922
Vegetia grimmia (Geyer, 1831)
Vegetia legraini Bouyer, 2004

References

 
Saturniinae